Kadayamottai Muslim National College is a national school in Madurankuli, Sri Lanka. It was previously called as Kadayamottai Muslim Maha Vidyalayam. The school was established on 1 April 1928 by Principal Mr. S. Kandhayya.

See also
 List of National schools in North Western Province, Sri Lanka

References

 Kadayamottai Muslim Central College

National schools in Sri Lanka
Schools in Puttalam District